Succisa trichotocephala is a species of plant in the family Caprifoliaceae. It is endemic to Cameroon. Its natural habitat is subtropical or tropical dry lowland grassland. It is threatened by habitat loss.

References

Endemic flora of Cameroon
trichotocephala
Near threatened plants
Taxonomy articles created by Polbot